Rutoceratidae is a family of prototypical nautilids, derived probably from either Brevicoceratidae or Acleistoceratidae of the order Oncocerida early in the Devonian.  Rutoceratidae comprise a family within the oncocerid superfamily Tainocerataceae They are generally characterized by cyrtoconic and gyroconic shells, commonly with spines, nodes, or frills, although some included genera are almost orthoconic, and a commonly empty, tubular ventral siphuncle.

The Rutocertids lived during the Devonian and Mississippian (early Carboniferous) and are the ancestral stock of Nautilida.  
Within the superfamily Taintocerataceae, rutoceratids gave rise to the exclusively Devonian family Tetragonoceratidae and near the start of the Mississippian to the family Koninckioceratidae which lasted into the Permian and to Tainoceratidae which lasted through most of the Triassic.

Genera
 Adelphoceras
 Anomaloceras
 Casteroceras
 Centrolitoceras
 Diademoceras
 Duerleyoceras
 Goldringia
 Halloceras
 Hercoceras
 Hindeoceras
 Homoadelphoceras
 Litogyroceras
 Muiroceras
 Pleuroncoceras
 Ptenoceras
 Ptyssoceras
 Roussanoffoceras
 Rutoceras
 Syrreghmatoceras
 Tetranodoceras
 Threaroceras
 Trochoceras
 Tylorthoceras

References

Nautiloids
Early Devonian first appearances
Mississippian extinctions